Carlos Indiano de Marcos (born 14 September 1988) is a Spanish footballer who plays for Las Rozas CF as a midfielder.

Club career
Born in Madrid, Indiano graduated with Atlético Madrid's youth setup, and made his debuts as a senior with the C-team in the 2007–08 campaign, in Tercera División. In the 2008 summer he was promoted to the reserves in Segunda División B.

Indiano continued to appear in the third level in the following seasons, representing Deportivo Alavés, Cádiz CF and Albacete Balompié. With the latter he appeared in 36 matches during the 2013–14 season, which ended in promotion.

On 6 September 2014 Indiano played his first match as a professional, replacing Portu in the 74th minute of a 1–1 home draw against Sporting de Gijón in the Segunda División championship. On 13 January of the following year, after appearing sparingly, he moved to third level's Hércules CF.

Career statistics

References

External links
 
 

1988 births
Living people
Footballers from Madrid
Spanish footballers
Association football midfielders
Segunda División players
Segunda División B players
Tercera División players
Atlético Madrid C players
Atlético Madrid B players
Deportivo Alavés players
Cádiz CF players
Albacete Balompié players
Hércules CF players
Lleida Esportiu footballers
Marbella FC players
Burgos CF footballers
Las Rozas CF players